Knut Dørum Lillebakk (born 27 April 1978) is a Norwegian former football goalkeeper.

Lillebakk has been the second-choice goalkeeper in Molde FK throughout his career, but he had short spells on loan in Bryne FK, Aalesunds FK, Bærum SK and IL Hødd.

In 2011 he moved to the town of Mysen, Eidsberg municipality (the Indre Østfold municipality as of January 2020), when he signed on as manager and part time player for the 2012 season with fifth-tier 4. divisjon amateur team Mysen IF.

Career statistics 

Source:

References

External links
 Profile at MoldeFK.no

1978 births
Living people
Molde FK players
Bryne FK players
Aalesunds FK players
Bærum SK players
IL Hødd players
Norwegian footballers
Eliteserien players

Association football goalkeepers